San Jacinto del Cauca is a town and municipality located in the Bolívar Department, northern Colombia.

Climate
San Jacinto del Cauca has a tropical monsoon climate (Am) with moderate to heavy rainfall from December to April and very heavy rainfall from May to November.

References

Municipalities of Bolívar Department